Nan Chen or Nanchen may refer to:

Chen Nan (born 1983), Chinese basketball player
Chinese cruiser Nan Thin (1883–1902), Chinese cruiser of the Imperial Chinese Navy
Chen dynasty (557–589), sometimes known as Nan Chen or Southern Chen dynasty
Nanchen Township, a township in Donghai County, Jiangsu, China

See also
Nangqên County or Nangchen County, Tibet